Nekane Díez Tapia (born 13 August 1991) is a Spanish football striker who plays for Athletic Bilbao of Spain's Primera División.

Díez made her debut for Athletic in a 4–0 win over ŽNK Krka in the 2007–08 UEFA Women's Cup a few days before her 16th birthday – she found the net in the match, and remains the club's youngest player and goalscorer. She was the third top scorer of the 2010–11 season with 24 goals. 

In December 2015 she suffered an anterior cruciate ligament injury while playing for the Basque Country against Catalonia.

Honours

Club
Athletic Bilbao
 Primera División: 2015–16

References

External links
 
 Nekane Díez at La Liga 
 
 
 

1991 births
Living people
Spanish women's footballers
Primera División (women) players
Athletic Club Femenino players
Footballers from Barakaldo
Women's association football forwards
21st-century Spanish women